Cornelis Weber (7 December 1899 – 28 May 1995) was a Dutch fencer. He competed in the individual and team épée events at the 1936 Summer Olympics.

References

External links
 

1899 births
1995 deaths
Dutch male épée fencers
Olympic fencers of the Netherlands
Fencers at the 1936 Summer Olympics
People from Banda Aceh
Sportspeople from Aceh